Koutouba is a town in north-eastern Ivory Coast. It is a sub-prefecture of Nassian Department in Bounkani Region, Zanzan District.

Koutouba was a commune until March 2012, when it became one of 1126 communes nationwide that were abolished.

In 2014, the population of the sub-prefecture of Koutouba was 5,705.

Villages
The nine villages of the sub-prefecture of Koutouba and their population in 2014 were:
 Allanikro (328)
 Digba (335)
 Gbrombiré (1 349)
 Kotouba (1 076)
 Lambira (828)
 Ouakorididjo (87)
 Primou (220)
 Saboukpa (958)
 Sèwè (524)

References

Sub-prefectures of Bounkani
Former communes of Ivory Coast